= Minden Playing Card Cricket =

Card game

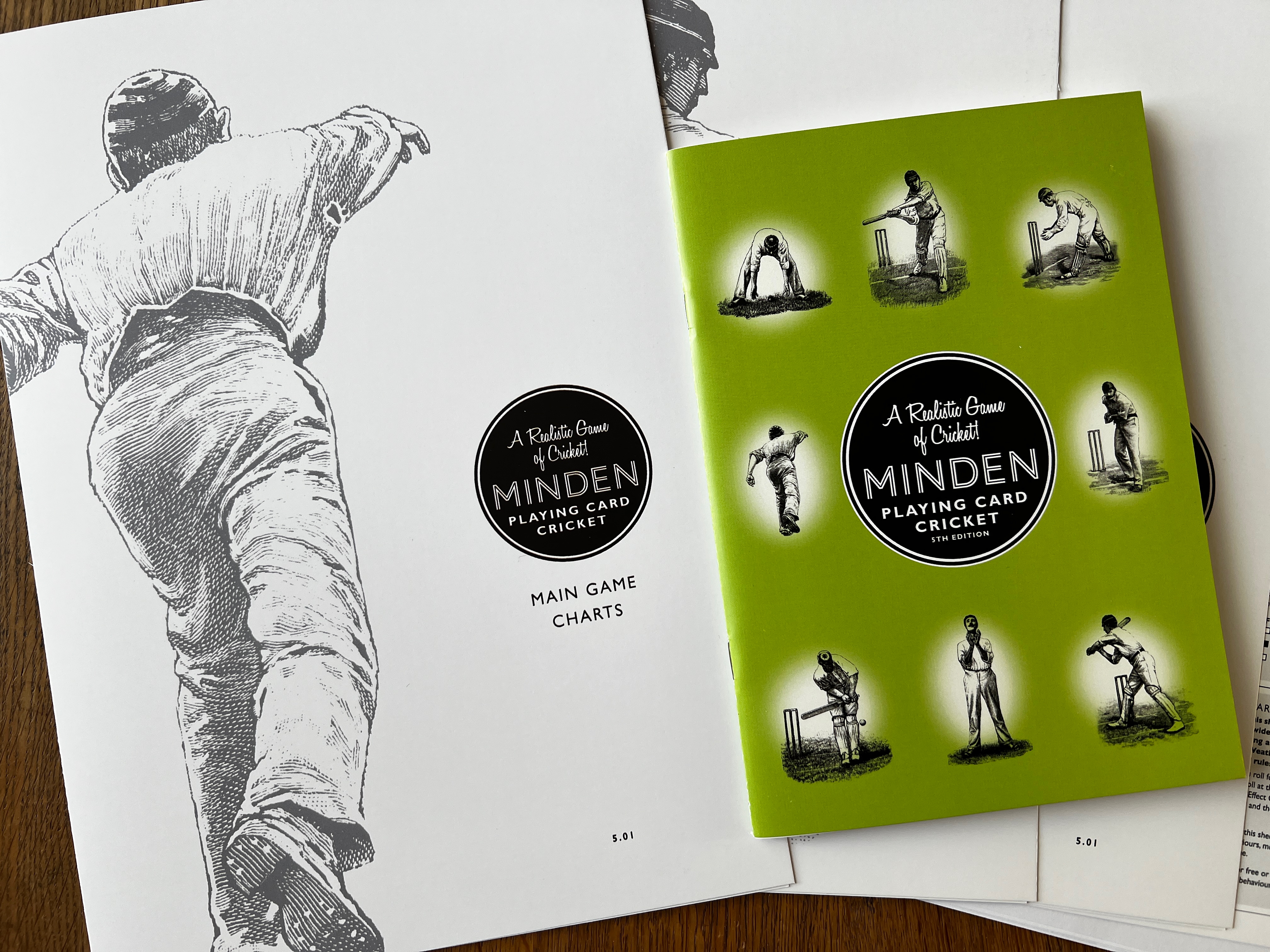

Minden Playing Card Cricket is a cricket board game that uses playing cards as a key part of the game mechanism to replicate Test and One Day Cricket. It was published in 1979 by Minden Games and designed by Gary Graber.

== Contents ==
Minden Playing Card Cricket is a game in which playing cards are used to determine the progress of play in cricket. Each draw of the card replicates an over of Test or One Day International Cricket. The game uses individual player cards based on real Test and One Day players and their career or series statistics. The 5th Edition of the game is published by Dagbostar Games which also produces annual player card updates for the Advanced version of the game.

== Reception ==
Mike Siggins reviewed Minden Playing Card Cricket for Games International magazine, and gave it a rating of 9 out of 10, and stated that "I liked this game a lot and with its great value for money, it's a winner."
